Attorney General Marshall may refer to

Dale Marshall (politician) (born 1963), Attorney General of Barbados
Edward C. Marshall (1821–1893), Attorney General of California
Jack Marshall (1912–1988), Attorney General of New Zealand
Steve Marshall (politician) (born 1964), Attorney General of Alabama

See also
General Marshall (disambiguation)